Mladen Žižović (Serbian Cyrillic: Младен Жижовић; born 27 December 1980) is a Bosnian professional football manager and former player. He was most recently manager of Bosnian Premier League club Sloboda Tuzla.

Previously, he was the manager of Zrinjski Mostar.

International career
Žižović made his debut for Bosnia and Herzegovina in a January 2008 friendly match away against Japan and has earned a total of 2 caps, scoring no goals. His second and final international was a June 2008 friendly against Azerbaijan.

Managerial statistics

Honours

Player
Radnik Bijeljina 
Bosnian Cup: 2015–16
First League of RS: 1998–99
Republika Srpska Cup: 2015–16

Zrinjski Mostar 
Bosnian Premier League: 2008–09
Bosnian Cup: 2007–08

Tirana 
Albanian Cup: 2010–11

Borac Banja Luka 
Republika Srpska Cup: 2011–12

Manager
Radnik Bijeljina
Republika Srpska Cup: 2016–17, 2017–18, 2018–19

References

External links

1980 births
Living people
People from Rogatica
Serbs of Bosnia and Herzegovina
Association football midfielders
Bosnia and Herzegovina footballers
Bosnia and Herzegovina international footballers
FK Radnik Bijeljina players
FK Rudar Ugljevik players
HŠK Zrinjski Mostar players
KF Tirana players
FK Borac Banja Luka players
First League of the Republika Srpska players
Premier League of Bosnia and Herzegovina players
Kategoria Superiore players
Bosnia and Herzegovina expatriate footballers
Expatriate footballers in Albania
Bosnia and Herzegovina expatriate sportspeople in Albania
Bosnia and Herzegovina football managers
FK Radnik Bijeljina managers
HŠK Zrinjski managers
FK Sloboda Tuzla managers
Premier League of Bosnia and Herzegovina managers